Aghili District is a district (bakhsh) in Gotvand County, Khuzestan Province, Iran. At the 2006 census, its population was 18,105, in 3,562 families.  The District has two cities Somaleh & Torkalaki.  The District has two rural districts (dehestan): Aghili-ye Jonubi Rural District and Aghili-ye Shomali Rural District.

References 

Gotvand County

Districts of Khuzestan Province